Mercurio (en:Mercury) is the second studio album by Italian rapper Emis Killa.

Track listing
  Wow – 3:06
  Scordarmi chi ero – 3:52
  MB45 – 3:04
  Lettera dall'inferno – 3:44
  A cena dai tuoi (feat. J-Ax) – 3:06
  Soli (Assieme) – 3:25
  Essere umano (feat. Skin) – 3:29
  Blocco Boyz (feat. G.Soave & Duellz) – 4:54
  Va bene – 3:00
  Gli stessi di sempre – 3:25
  Straight Rydah – 3:39
  Fratelli a metà – 3:37
  Vietnam Flow (feat. Salmo) – 3:43
  La testa vuota (feat. Max Pezzali) – 4:18
  Mercurio – 3:43

Bonus track on iTunes
  Lettera dall'inferno (Bonus Version) – 3:21

References

2013 albums
Emis Killa albums